In quantum information theory, the classical capacity of a quantum channel is the maximum rate at which classical data can be sent over it error-free in the limit of many uses of the channel. Holevo, Schumacher, and Westmoreland proved the following least upper bound on the classical capacity of any quantum channel :

where  is a classical-quantum state of the following form:

 is a probability distribution, and each  is a density operator that can be input to the channel .

Achievability using sequential decoding 

We briefly review the HSW coding theorem (the
statement of the achievability of the Holevo information rate  for
communicating classical data over a quantum channel). We first review the
minimal amount of quantum mechanics needed for the theorem. We then cover
quantum typicality, and finally we prove the theorem using a recent sequential
decoding technique.

Review of quantum mechanics

In order to prove the HSW coding theorem, we really just need a few basic
things from quantum mechanics. First, a quantum state is a unit trace,
positive operator known as a density operator. Usually, we denote it
The simplest model for a quantum channel
is known as a classical-quantum channel:

The meaning of the above notation is that inputting the classical letter 
at the transmitting end leads to a quantum state  at the receiving
end. It is the task of the receiver to perform a measurement to determine the
input of the sender. If it is true that the states  are perfectly
distinguishable from one another (i.e., if they have orthogonal supports such
that  for ), then the channel is a noiseless channel. We are interested in situations
for which this is not the case. If it is true that the states  all
commute with one another, then this is effectively identical to the situation
for a classical channel, so we are also not interested in these situations.
So, the situation in which we are interested is that in which the states
 have overlapping support and are non-commutative.

The most general way to describe a quantum measurement is with a 
positive operator-valued measure (POVM). We usually denote the elements of a POVM as
. These operators should satisfy
positivity and completeness in order to form a valid POVM:

The probabilistic interpretation of quantum mechanics states that if someone
measures a quantum state  using a measurement device corresponding to
the POVM , then the probability  for obtaining outcome  is equal to

and the post-measurement state is

if the person measuring obtains outcome . These rules are sufficient for us
to consider classical communication schemes over cq channels.

Quantum typicality

The reader can find a good review of this topic in the article about the typical subspace.

Gentle operator lemma

The following lemma is important for our proofs. It
demonstrates that a measurement that succeeds with high probability on average
does not disturb the state too much on average:

Lemma: [Winter] Given an
ensemble  with expected
density operator , suppose
that an operator  such that  succeeds with high
probability on the state :

Then the subnormalized state  is close
in expected trace distance to the original state :

(Note that  is the nuclear norm of the operator
 so that Tr.)

The following inequality is useful for us as well. It holds for any operators

The quantum information-theoretic interpretation of the above inequality is
that the probability of obtaining outcome  from a quantum measurement
acting on the state  is upper bounded by the probability of obtaining
outcome  on the state  summed with the distinguishability of

Non-commutative union bound
Lemma: [Sen's bound] The following bound
holds for a subnormalized state  such that  and
,  being
projectors:

We can think of Sen's bound as a "non-commutative union
bound" because it is analogous to the following union bound
from probability theory:

where  are events. The analogous bound for projector
logic would be

subspaces. Though, the above bound only holds if the projectors ,
If the projectors are non-commuting, then Sen's
bound is the next best thing and suffices for our purposes here.

HSW theorem with the non-commutative union bound

We now prove the HSW theorem with Sen's non-commutative union bound. We
divide up the proof into a few parts: codebook generation, POVM construction,
and error analysis.

Codebook Generation.  We first describe how Alice and Bob agree on a
random choice of code. They have the channel  and a
distribution . They choose  classical sequences
 according to the IID\ distribution .
This leads to the following
quantum codewords:

The quantum codebook is then . The average state of the codebook is then

where .

POVM Construction . Sens' bound from the above lemma 
suggests a method for Bob to decode a state that Alice transmits. Bob should
first ask "Is the received state in the average typical
subspace?" He can do this operationally by performing a
Next, he asks in sequential order,
"Is the received codeword in the 
conditionally typical subspace?" This is in some sense
equivalent to the question, "Is the received codeword the
 transmitted codeword?" He can ask these
questions operationally by performing the measurements corresponding to the
conditionally typical projectors .

Why should this sequential decoding scheme work well? The reason is that the
transmitted codeword lies in the typical subspace on average:

where the inequality follows from (\ref{eq:1st-typ-prop}). Also, the
projectors 
are "good detectors" for the states  (on average) because the following condition holds from conditional quantum
typicality:

Error Analysis. The probability of detecting the 
codeword correctly under our sequential decoding scheme is equal to

where we make the abbreviation . (Observe that we
project into the average typical subspace just once.) Thus, the probability of
an incorrect detection for the  codeword is given by

and the average error probability of this scheme is equal to

Instead of analyzing the average error probability, we analyze the expectation
of the average error probability, where the expectation is with respect to the
random choice of code:

Our first step is to apply Sen's bound to the above quantity. But before doing
so, we should rewrite the above expression just slightly, by observing that

Substituting into (and forgetting about the small
 term for now) gives an upper bound of

This gives the upper bound

Due to concavity of the square root, we can bound this expression from above
by

where the second bound follows by summing over all of the codewords not equal
to the  codeword (this sum can only be larger).

We now focus exclusively on showing that the term inside the square root can
be made small. Consider the first term:

second inequality follows from the gentle operator lemma and the
properties of unconditional and conditional typicality. Consider now the
second term and the following chain of inequalities:

The first equality follows because the codewords  and
 are independent since they are different. The second
The first inequality follows from
(\ref{eq:3rd-typ-prop}). Continuing, we have

the trace with the expectation. The second inequality follows from
(\ref{eq:2nd-cond-typ}). The next two are straightforward.

Putting everything together, we get our final bound on the expectation of the
average error probability:

Thus, as long as we choose , there exists a code with vanishing error probability.

See also 

 Entanglement-assisted classical capacity
 Quantum capacity
 Quantum information theory
 Typical subspace

References 
.
.

.
.

Quantum information theory
Limits of computation